The Taikan Range is a mountain range in Khabarovsk Krai, Russian Far East. The closest inhabited place is Chumikan, Tuguro-Chumikansky District.  The nearest airport is Chumikan Airport.

There are deposits of Irnimite (blue jasper) in the northwestern spurs of the Taikan Range, in the river basins of the Nimi and its tributary the Ir. The mineral Taikanite is named after this mountain range.

History
The range is mentioned in "The Classic of the Eastern Mountains", an ancient Chinese text, as Mount Pei-hao, located near the North Sea (Sea of Okhotsk). The present Chinese name is Cha-ko-ti Mountain Range.

In the 17th century, at tne time of the Treaty of Nerchinsk, the eastern section of the border between the Kivun and Taikan ranges was left undefined. The range was unexplored until the 1849-1852 Trans-Baikal expedition of Ludwig Schwarz.

Geography
The range is bound to the northwest by the valley of the Uda river. The Selemdzha Range rises to the west of the SW flank. In the E-9 sheet of the Defense Mapping Agency Navigation charts the map shows the peak as an  summit.

Rivers Torom and Tyl have their sources in the eastern side of the range. The Tyl Range (Тыльский хребет), a northeastern prolongation of the Taikan Range, stretches from south to north between both rivers. Lake Bokon is located below the slopes of the northwestern side of the range.

See also
List of mountains and hills of Russia
Nerchinsk Treaty

References

External links
Tourism

Mountain ranges of Khabarovsk Krai

ceb:Taykanskiy Khrebet